Andrea Brewster (born 10 October 1982) is an Irish sailor. She represented Ireland at the 2016 Summer Olympics in the 49erFX class.

References

External links
 
 
 

1982 births
Living people
Irish female sailors (sport)
Olympic sailors of Ireland
Sailors at the 2016 Summer Olympics – 49er FX